The 2016 South American Artistic Gymnastics Championships were held in Lima, Peru November 18–20, 2016. The competition was organized by the Peruvian Gymnastics Federation and approved by the International Gymnastics Federation. This was the 15th edition of the South American Artistic Gymnastics Championships for senior gymnasts.

Participating nations

Medalists

Medal table

References

2016 in gymnastics
South American Gymnastics Championships
International gymnastics competitions hosted by Peru
2016 in Peruvian sport